The 2009–10 Cypriot First Division was the 71st season of the Cypriot top-level football league. It started on 29 August 2009. APOEL were the defending champions.

Competition modus
Fourteen teams will participate in the competition. Eleven of them have also competed in the 2008–09 season while the remaining three teams were promoted from the Second Division.

Each team will play against every other team twice, once at home and once away, for a total of 26 matches. After these matches, the two teams with the worst records will be relegated to the Second Division. The remaining twelve teams will be divided into three groups of four teams each.

The teams ranked first through fourth will play out the champion and the participants for the European competitions. Teams ranked ninth through 12th will determine the third relegated club, while the remaining four teams will play a placement round. Every team plays twice against its group opponents. Regular season records are carried over without any modifications.

Team changes from 2009–10
Relegated to Second Division 2009–10:
 12th-placed team: APEP Pitsilia
 13th-placed team: Nea Salamis
 14th-placed team: Aris

Promoted from Second Division 2009–10:
 Champions: Alki Larnaca
 Runners-up: AEK Larnaca
 3rd-placed team: Olympiakos Nicosia

Overview

Stadiums and Locations
Due to the ongoing Cypriot separation, several clubs originally located in the Turkish occupied part of the island play in the unoccupied part. Further, not all home grounds fulfil the requirements for Cypriot top-level football. Thus, the map depicts the current home ground of each team and not its original location.

Personnel and sponsoring

Managerial changes
The following list represents every head coach change for any team during the season (1 July 2009 – 30 June 2010).

First round

League table

Results

Second round

Group A

Table

Results

Group B

Table

Results

Group C

Table

Results

Top goalscorers
Including matches played on 8 May 2010; Source: CFA official website

See also
 2009–10 Cypriot Cup
 2009–10 Cypriot Second Division
 List of Cypriot football transfers summer 2009

References

Sources

External links

Cypriot First Division seasons
Cyprus
1